Atti may refer to:

Atti, Jalandhar, a village in Punjab, India
Atti (film), a 2016 Tamil film
Atti Aboyni (1946), Hungarian-born Australian soccer player and manager
Isotta degli Atti (1433–1474) Italian woman
Atti family, lords of Sassoferrato in the 13th-15th Centuries